Todd Wright is an American music composer, songwriter and producer from the Washington D.C. area. Todd has collaborated with artists such as Butch Walker, Toby Lightman, Lucy Woodward, Audra Mae, Cazzette and numerous Korean Pop Stars VIXX and Luna. In addition to Todd's domestic and international chart success, he is credited with many songs placements in TV and Film

Career
Todd Wright is an American music composer, songwriter and producer from the Washington D.C. area. Todd has collaborated with artists such as Celine Dion, Johnny Hallyday, Butch Walker, Toby Lightman, Lucy Woodward, Audra Mae, Cazzette and Korean Pop Stars VIXX, Luna and Amber Liu (singer). In addition to Todd's domestic and international chart success, he is credited with many songs placements in TV and Film. His songwriting has been streamed more than 70 million times and certified Platinum and Gold in Canada, France and Belgium.

Discography
 Cazzette feat. Terri B - Blind Heart (PRMD Records) - 65,816,776 streams. Billboard Dance #1.
 VIXX - G.R.8.U (Jellyfish Entertainment) - 668,082 streams
 Toby Lightman - Holding A Heart (T Killa Record) - 3,587,694 streams
 Johnny Hallyday w/ Celine Dion - L'amour peut prendre froid (Warner Music France) multi-platinum (France).
 Celine Dion w/ Johnny Hallyday - L'amour peut prendre froid (Columbia) - platinum (France), gold (Belgium), gold (Canada)
 Lisa Lois - Smoke (Sony) 
 Audra Mae - Smoke (Sideone Dummy Records)
 Lena Meyer-Landrut - A Good Day (Universal)
 Luna - Galaxy (SM Entertainment) - 894,212 streams
 Luna + Amber Liu (singer) - Heartbeat (SM Entertainment) - 1,991,244 streams
 Ryan Wright - u were never mine (Handwritten) - 313,949 streams
 Ryan Wright - Fake ID (Handwritten)
 Ryan Wright - A Dream I'll Forget (EP - Handwritten)
 Sister Hazel - In Two, She’s All You Need, On and On, Shelter (Croakin’ Poet) - 1,131,688 streams

TV and Film Placements:
Nude (2017 American film) (Documentary / Starz) “Landmines” - co-wrote, produced
Hello Goodbye (Series / CBC Canada) “Through the Blue” - co-wrote, produced
Pitch (Series / FOX) “Blind Heart” - co-wrote
Lady Jewelpet (Series / TV Tokyo) “Your Love” (Theme Song) - co-wrote, co-produced
Bones (Season 6) (Series / FOX) “Unlucky Stars” - co-wrote, produced, performed
90210 (Season 5) (Series / CW) “Holding a Heart” - co-wrote, produced
One Tree Hill Season 8 (Series / CW) “Holding a Heart” - co-wrote, produced
The Vampire Diaries (Series / CW) “Holding a Heart” - co-wrote, produced
The Originals (TV series) (Series / CW) “Blind Heart” - co-wrote
Whats Your Number? (Motion Picture / 20th Century FOX) “Holding a Heart” - co-wrote, produced
Hollywood Heights (Series / Nick at Nite) “You’ve Got This Hold on Me” - co-wrote, produced
Switched at Birth (Series / ABC Family) “Holding a Heart” - co-wrote, produced
Live For the Moment (Special / CBS) “Live For the Moment” - co-wrote, produced
Proven Innocent (Series / FOX) “Devil Won’t Let You Go” - co-wrote
Council of Dads (Series / NBC) “All In” - co-wrote, produced
Big Shot (TV series) (Series / Disney+) “All In” - co-wrote, produced
Ginny & Georgia (Series / Netflix) “u were never mine” - co-wrote, co-produced
The Unbreakable Boy (Motion Picture / Lionsgate) “What I Like About You” - co-produced
Cruel Summer (TV series) (Series / Freeform) “Zombie” - co-produced	
16 and Pregnant (Series / MTV) “Family” - co-wrote, co-produced
90 Day Journey (Series / Discovery+) - “It’s All About to Change” - co-wrote, co-produced

Advertisments:
 IKEA - Bring Home to Life - "Your Song" - co-arranged, co-produced
 Peroni Libera 0.0% - Il Pit Stop - July 2021 “Light Up the Fire Inside” - co-wrote, produced
 Peroni Nastro Azzuro - Back to Zero - “Viva La Vida” - co-wrote, produced
 Peroni Nastro Azzuro - Back to Zero - “Something From Nothing” - co-wrote, produced
 Peroni Libera 0.0% x Aston Martin Formule 1 - “Light Up the Fire Inside” - co-wrote, produced
 Elevation Advertising - For the World - co-composer, producer

References 

 Cazzette "Blind Heart" (2014) All Music Guide
 Lisa Lois "Smoke" (2009) All Music Guide
 Lena Meyer-Landrut "Good News" (2011) All Music Guide
 WAMA Winners (2012) 
 Toby Lightman "Holding A Heart" (2013) All Music Guide
 IKEA "Bring Home to Life" (2022) 
 Peroni Libera 0.0% - Il Pit Stop (2021) 
 Peroni Nastro Azzuro - Back to Zero - “Viva La Vida” 
 Peroni Nastro Azzuro - Back to Zero - “Something From Nothing” 
 Peroni Libera 0.0% x Aston Martin Formule 1 - “Light Up the Fire Inside” 
 Elevation Advertising - For the World 
 Ryan Wright "Fake ID" 
 The Vampire Diaries - Season 2 Finale - "Holding a Heart" (scene)

External links
  Todd Wright on PEN Music

Year of birth missing (living people)
Living people
Songwriters from Virginia
People from Leesburg, Virginia
Musicians from Virginia
Record producers from Virginia